Jiang Tianyi (born 28 February 1988) is a male table tennis player. He won the men's singles title at the 2008 Brazil Open. In 2010, he won 3 doubles titles on the ITTF Pro Tour, including 2010 ITTF Pro Tour Grand Finals.

References

External links
 

Hong Kong male table tennis players
Table tennis players at the 2012 Summer Olympics
Olympic table tennis players of Hong Kong
Living people
Table tennis players from Shandong
1988 births
Sportspeople from Jinan
Asian Games medalists in table tennis
Table tennis players at the 2010 Asian Games
Table tennis players at the 2014 Asian Games
Table tennis players at the 2018 Asian Games
Chinese male table tennis players
Asian Games silver medalists for Hong Kong
Medalists at the 2014 Asian Games